Run for Your Wife (lit. The American wife ) is a 1965 Italian comedy film directed by Gian Luigi Polidoro.

Plot
An unhappily married Italian man working at a shoe factory travels to America on a business trip. In New York City he meets an old friend who married a wealthy American woman and sets off across America to do the same.

Cast

References

External links 
 

1965 films
1960s Italian-language films
1965 comedy films
Films directed by Gian Luigi Polidoro
Films set in the United States
Italian comedy films
Films with screenplays by Rafael Azcona
1960s Italian films